The 2005 FIBA Europe Under-20 Championship was the eighth edition of the FIBA Europe Under-20 Championship. The city of Chekhov, in Russia, hosted the tournament. Russia won their first title.

Ukraine and the Czech Republic were relegated to Division B.

Format change
For the first time, the format of the competition was changed. Four more teams entered the competition, and another round was played. The two last teams were relegated to Division B.

Teams

Squads

Preliminary round
The sixteen teams were allocated in four groups of four teams each.

Group A

Group B

Group C

Group D

Quarter-Final round
The eight teams were allocated in two groups of four teams each.

Group E

Group F

Classification round
The eight teams were allocated in two groups of four teams each.

Group G

Group H

Knockout stage

13th–16th playoffs

Ukraine and the Czech Republic were relegated to Division B.

9th–12th playoffs

5th–8th playoffs

Championship

Final standings

Stats leaders

Points

Rebounds

Assists

All-Tournament Team
  Nikita Kurbanov
  Renaldas Seibutis
  Artūras Jomantas
  Luka Bogdanović
  Lior Eliyahu

References
FIBA Archive
FIBA Europe Archive

FIBA U20 European Championship
2005–06 in European basketball
2005–06 in Russian basketball
International youth basketball competitions hosted by Russia